The Ufente is a river in the province of Latium, in the historic area of the Pontine Marshes.  It was known as Aufentus in Latin.  It flows in a channel to the Tyrrhenian Sea at Tarracina, joining a parallel channel, the Fiume Portatore, less than one kilometer from the sea.

Fishing is permitted along at least parts of the river.

According to Strabo:In front of Tarracina lies a great marsh, formed by two rivers; the larger one is called the Aufidus (Ufente). It is here that the Appian Way first touches the sea ... Near Tarracina, as you go toward Rome, there is a canal that runs alongside the Appian Way, and is fed at numerous places by waters from the marshes and the rivers ... The boat is towed by a mule.

References

External links
Historic photos of the Fiume Ufente
1^ prova regionale B5 Lazio 2013 - Fiume Ufente - Girone B, a video of fishing competition in 2013 the Ufente.
Feeder in Tour - Ufente, a 2017 video

Rivers of Italy